A Crazy Day is a 1956 Soviet comedy film directed by .

Plot 
The manager wants the creche to open on time and he is ready to do everything possible for this. But the trouble is: the bureaucrat does not want to put the resolution necessary for this on the last working day. To achieve his goal, the manager will pretend to be another person.

Cast
 Igor Ilyinsky as Zajtsev
 Sergey Martinson as Miusov  
 Serafima Birman as Doctor
 Anastasiya Georgievskaya as  sister-mistress 
 Rostislav Plyatt as Dudkin
 Irina Zarubina as Dudkina
 Vladimir Volodin as  door-keeper
 Nina Doroshina as Shura
 Igor Gorbachyov as Konstantin Galushkin
 Olga Aroseva as Miusov's Secretary
 Zinaida Naryshkina as  old typist
 Sergei Blinnikov as  client
 Tamara Loginova as Klava Ignatyuk

References

External links 
 
 Безумный день on Mosfilm

1956 films
Soviet comedy films
1956 comedy films
Mosfilm films
1950s Russian-language films